Kenneth Pentin "Le Clou" Farmer,  (July 26, 1912 – January 12, 2005) was a Canadian Chartered Accountant, a Winter Olympics silver medal winner in ice hockey, and a president of the Canadian Olympic Association (now known as the Canadian Olympic Committee).

Background
Born in Westmount, Quebec, he received a Bachelor of Commerce degree from McGill University. In 1934 he joined the accounting firm of McDonald Currie & Company (now Coopers & Lybrand) and became a Chartered Accountant in 1937. He became a partner in 1945 until his retirement in 1977.

Farmer was an outstanding hockey player. He was a member of the 1936 Port Arthur Bearcats, which won the silver medal for Canada in ice hockey at the 1936 Winter Olympics. He had the second highest points at the Olympics with 10 goals and four assists. Canada had been expected to win the gold medal, but several incidents led to winning the silver medal instead. After the Olympics, Farmer stated that none of Canada's officials knew what playoff system was being used and that E. A. Gilroy and Fred Marples "were blissfully unaware of what it was all about".

During World War II, he served with The Royal Montreal Regiment and the Manitoba Dragoons. He was discharged with the rank of Major and was Mentioned in Dispatches in 1945.

From 1953 to 1961, he was the President of the Canadian Olympic Association. He was President of the Commonwealth Games Association of Canada from 1977 to 1983. He was a Governor of Canada's Sports Hall of Fame from 1980 to 1990.

Honours
1971, inducted into the Canadian Olympic Hall of Fame in 1971
1981, made a Member of the Order of Canada
1987, inducted into the Northwestern Ontario Sports Hall of Fame as a member of the 1936 Olympic team
1999, inducted to the McGill University Sports Hall of Fame

References
 
 
 

1912 births
2005 deaths
Anglophone Quebec people
Canadian accountants
Ice hockey players at the 1936 Winter Olympics
McGill University Faculty of Management alumni
Medalists at the 1936 Winter Olympics
Members of the Order of Canada
Olympic ice hockey players of Canada
Olympic medalists in ice hockey
Olympic silver medalists for Canada
People from Westmount, Quebec
Presidents of the Canadian Olympic Committee